London Buses route 117 is a Transport for London contracted bus route in London and Surrey, England. Running between West Middlesex University Hospital and Staines, it is operated by London United.

History

3 October 1934, Hounslow Garage (AV) ST operated service from Hounslow Bus Station to Egham (Eclipse) Monday-Saturday with a Sunday extension to Windsor Castle. August 1935 revised service operating between Hounslow Bus Station & Staines (Bridge Street); Monday-Friday & Saturday a.m. with a Windsor Castle extension on Saturday p.m. & Sundays. 2 months later, daily operation terminating at Staines (Bridge Street). April 1936 daily extended to Virginia Water via Egham. Winters 1936 - 1938 Sunday a.m. curtailment at Egham with the following three summers Sunday a.m. to Virginia Water was reinstated. November 1939 the service returned to Hounslow Bus Station & Egham (Eclipse) still operated by ST vehicles. Curtailed to Staines on Sundays a.m. between May 1943 to July 1945.

Partially converted to RT in October 1948, with a full conversion to RT in May 1957.

Service 117 became part of the Routemaster conversion of the Trolleybus Service 657 Shepherds Bush Green – Hounslow. The service from 9 May 1962 became Shepherds Bush Green to Egham, Monday-Saturday with a shorter Sunday route from Hounslow Bus Station to Egham. Turnham Green Garage (V) gained Saturday work of 7 RTs from July 1964. In August 1969 the Sunday service was revised to run between Shepherds Bush Green and Staines allowing Service 81 to be withdrawn. Turnham Green Garage (V) adds a Monday-Friday allocation to its existing Saturday work from January 1970. 13 June 1970 full conversion to Routemaster. Revised service 90 replaced Service 117 between Staines & Egham daily. 19 July 1975.

January 1978 and again the service was part of a bigger scheme. On this occasion a new Service 237 took over Shepherds Bush to Hounslow Bus Station leaving the 117 to run between Brentford (County Court) and Hounslow Bus Station Monday-Fridays (except evenings) to Staines daily. Also from this date the allocation became 100% Hounslow Garage (AV) using one man operated Leyland Nationals (LN). In June 1983, the Sunday evening service extended to Brentford (County Court). This arrangement lasted until February of the following year when the whole of the Sunday service started from Hounslow Bus Station and journeys (daily) bifurcated during visiting hours to Ashford Hospital.

A new low cost operation was set up ‘Westlink’ operating from a base at Hounslow Heath to run the service from 9 August 1986.

Contract tendering

ComfortDelGro in the guise of Metroline bought out Armchair and absorbed them into the bus operation in January 2007 and the remainder of the contract was transferred to them to start from 6 January 2007. They did not however retain the contract when next awarded in September 2011 for 5 years, Abellio was the successful operator using a depot at Twickenham (TF). October 2016 and the contract awarded to Metroline from Brentford Garage (AH); Dart allocation Monday-Saturday 9, Sunday 7.

Current route
Route 117 operates via these primary locations:
West Middlesex University Hospital
St John's Road for Isleworth station 
West Thames College
Hounslow High Street
Hounslow Heath
North Feltham
Feltham for Feltham station 
Ashford station 
Staines station 
Staines bus station

References

External links

Bus routes in London
Transport in the London Borough of Hounslow
Transport in Surrey